This is a list of the members of the Faroese Løgting in the period 2019–2022; they were elected at the general election on 31 August 2019. The thirty-three elected members are:

References

 2019
2019 in the Faroe Islands
2019-2022